Karel Leendert Miljon (17 September 1903, Amsterdam – 8 February 1984, Bennebroek) was a Dutch boxer, who won the bronze medal in the light heavyweight division at the 1928 Summer Olympics in Amsterdam.

Miljon won the Dutch title eleven times, and also participated in the 1924 Summer Olympics in Paris, where he was eliminated in the first round of the light heavyweight competition after losing his fight against the upcoming gold medalist Harry Mitchell.

1928 Olympic results 
Below is the record of Karel Miljon, a Dutch light heavyweight boxer who competed at the 1928 Amsterdam Olympics:

Round of 16: Defeated Emil Johansson (Sweden) on points
Quarterfinal: Defeated Alfred Jackson (Great Britain) on points
Semifinal: Lost to Ernst Pistulla (Germany) on points
Bronze Medal Bout: Defeated Don McCorkindale (South Africa) on points (was awarded bronze medal)

References

External links
 boksnieuws.com
databaseolympics.com

1903 births
1984 deaths
Light-heavyweight boxers
Olympic boxers of the Netherlands
Boxers at the 1924 Summer Olympics
Boxers at the 1928 Summer Olympics
Olympic bronze medalists for the Netherlands
Boxers from Amsterdam
Olympic medalists in boxing
Dutch male boxers
Medalists at the 1928 Summer Olympics